Justin Howell (born December 4, 1993) is a professional Canadian football defensive back for the Ottawa Redblacks of the Canadian Football League (CFL). He played U Sports football for the Carleton Ravens.

Early career
Howell first began his interest in football in grade 10 while attending Bradford District High School. He then played for the Carleton Ravens from 2014 to 2017.

Professional career
Howell was drafted by the Ottawa Redblacks with the 55th overall selection, in the seventh round, of the 2018 CFL Draft and signed with the team on May 16, 2018. He made the team following training camp and played in his first professional game on June 22, 2018 against the Saskatchewan Roughriders in the 2018 season opening game. He earned his first start at safety on August 11, 2018 against the Montreal Alouettes. Howell played in 13 regular season games and recorded seven defensive tackles and eight special teams tackles while missing five games due to injury. He then played in his first post-season game in the East Final against the Hamilton Tiger-Cats where he recorded a career-high six defensive tackles in a win that sent him to his first Grey Cup game. However, he recorded no stats as the Redblacks lost the 106th Grey Cup to the Calgary Stampeders.

In 2019, Howell played in 14 regular season games and had 14 defensive tackles and eight special teams tackles. He also recorded his first career quarterback sack on September 7, 2019 against the Toronto Argonauts. He signed a one-year contract extension with the Redblacks on January 14, 2020, but with the 2020 CFL season cancelled, it was announced on December 18, 2020 that he had signed another one-year extension with the team.

References

External links 
Ottawa Redblacks bio

1993 births
Living people
Canadian football defensive backs
Carleton Ravens football players
Ottawa Redblacks players
Players of Canadian football from Ontario
Sportspeople from Simcoe County